Acholia is pallor of the faeces, which lack their normal brown colour, as a result of impaired bile secretion into the bowel. It can also be referred to as hypocholia. Acholia is a sign pointing to reduced or lacking flow of conjugated bilirubin into the bowel, as a result of a problem in the liver itself or in the biliary tree.

Etymology 
Ancient Greek: a + chole (without bile).

Cause 
A condition in which little or no bile is secreted or the flow of bile into the digestive tract is obstructed. The acholia is a sign of many diseases, such as hepatitis.
Acholia causes the color of feces to fade.

See also 
 Choluria

References

External links 

Medical signs
Medical terminology